Sheng-Ching Chang (張省卿; born 1963 in Tainan, Taiwan) is a Taiwanese art historian. She serves as the director of the Graduate Institute of Museum Studies at Fu Jen Catholic University and the professor at the Department of History of Fu Jen Catholic University in Taipei.

Life
She attended Fu Jen Catholic University in Taipei, Taiwan receiving a B.A. with a major in history and a minor in international trade. From 1986 to 1995, she studied at the University of Hamburg in Germany, obtaining a master's degree in art history and history with her thesis Das Porträt von Johann Adam Schall von Bell in Athanasius Kirchers ‘China illustrata’ (The Portrait of Johann Adam Schall von Bell in Athanasius Kircher’s ‘China illustrata’). From 1996 until 2002, she studied at the Department of Art History of Humboldt University in Berlin, Germany where she received her PhD with her thesis The Image of China in Nature and Landscape of Athanasius Kircher’s ‘China illustrata’.

From 1988 to 1997, Chang worked as a journalist for the Taiwanese newspapers Independent Morning Post, Independent Evening Post and Independent Weekly Post. She wrote for magazines such as Artist, ARTIMA and Art of Collection in Taipei and Nineties in Hong Kong. She was also a photographic reporter for the Taiwanese edition of National Geographic Magazine and an editor for the German magazines Diskus and Pen, which discusses topics including the development of art and culture in Europe and Asia.

Chang worked as an assistant professor of history and art history at Fu Jen Catholic University, Taipei National University of Arts and National Taiwan University of Arts in Taipei from 2002 until 2006. She was later appointed full associate professor (2009) and full professor (2016) at the History Department and Graduate Institute of Fu Jen University. In 2018, she was an adjunct professor at the Graduate Institute of Art History at National Taiwan Normal University in Taipei, Taiwan. Since 2020, she has served as the director of the Graduate Institute of Museum Studies at Fu Jen. Her research focus has been European art history in the global context, the history of artistic and cultural exchange between the East and the West, the methodology of art history and the history of colonial urban development.

Since 2005, along with her lecturing responsibilities, Chang has organized yearly conferences in collaboration with her colleagues at Fu Jen Catholic University on the ‘History of Cultural Exchange’, as well as a series of yearly lectures (2008–) and workshops (2011–) examining ‘World History’. She has organized panels at institutions across Asia and Europe, including the Institute of History at the University of Oxford, the University of Munich, the Institute of Oriental Studies of Jagiellonian University in Kraków, the Taipei National Palace Museum and the China Central Academy of Fine Arts in Beijing. In 2019 Chang was at the Jagiellonian University as a special professor, where she lectured on “Chinese Art History and Its Globalization" (on the following six subjects: “Chinese Cities: Beijing,” “Chinese Gardens: Suzhou Gardens,” “Chinese Architecture: Nanjing Pagoda,” “Chinese Painting: Landscape Painting,” “Chinese Sculpture: Buddha statues” and “Chinese Handicraft: Blue and White Porcelain") Further, she edited the Fu Jen Historical Journal, reviewed the Journal of Fine Arts at Taipei National University of the Arts and sat on scholarships and history research association boards.

Scholarships and prizes
 1990 – 1995                  Scholarship from the German Friedrich - Naumann Foundation for a Master’s degree
 
 1996 – 1999                  Scholarship from the German Heinrich - Böll Foundation for a PhD
 
 2000 – 2001                  Scholarship from the Taipei Chiang Ching-Kuo Foundation for PhD students in the Europe International Scholarly Exchange Program
 
 2003                              Financial support from the German Research Foundation (Deutsche Forschungsgemeinschaft) for the publication of a monograph 
 
 2003                             Grant from the National Science Council of Taiwan
 
 2007 – 2008                  Grant from the National Science Council of Taiwan: The influence of German style urban planning on the central area of administrative buildings in the city of Taipei by the Japanese colonial administration 
 2006 – 2009, 2013       Five-time recipient of the Annual Award from Fu Jen Catholic University for research achievements
 
 2010 – 2011                  Grant from the National Science Council of Taiwan: Reconstruction of Chinese style gardens in Germany from 17th and 18th  Century 
 2011 – 2012                  Grant from the National Science Council of Taiwan: The Reconstruction of Chinese Style Gardens in Eastern Germany in the latter half of the 18th century using the example of the Garden of Wörlitz (1700-1813) 2016 – 2018                  Grant from the National Science Council of Taiwan: The Construction of Chinoiserie Gardens in 18 th Century Sanssouci in Potsdam, Prussia 
 2017                              Received the Academic Research Award of Fu Jen Catholic University for a monograph 

 2018 – 2021                  Grant from the National Science Council of Taiwan: The beautiful Utopia in Images of Mechanics from 17th and 18th century Europe and Exchange with China 2019 – 2021                  Grant from the National Science Council of Taiwan: Exchange of Chinese and Western scientific images in the 17th and 18th centuries (II) with the example of the Yijing binary diagrams 
 2020 – 2021                  Grant from the National Science Council of Taiwan: Scientific and Artistic exchange between China and the West in the 17th and 18th centuries based on binary diagrams from Yijing (III)Publications

Monographies
 Natur und Landschaft － der Einfluss von Athanasius Kirchers China illustrata auf die europäische Kunst, Berlin (Dietrich Reimer Verlag GmbH), 2003.
 The influence of German style urban planning on the central area of administrative buildings in the city of Taipei by the Japanese colonial administration, Taipei (Fu Jen Catholic University Press), 2008.
 The East enlightening the West – Chinese elements in the 18th century landscape gardens of Wörlitz in Germany, Taipei (Fu Jen Catholic University Press), 2015.
 A New Perspective: History of Eastern and Western Art Exchange under Globalizationy, Taipei (China Times Publishing Co.), 2022.

Chapters of monographies
 Studentenprotest und Repression in China, April bis Juli 1989, in Ruth Cremerius, Doris Fischer and Peter Schier, eds. Hamburg (Institut für Asienkunde, Mitteilungen des Instituts für Asienkunde Hamburg), 1990.
 “Das Porträt von Johann Adam Schall von Bell in Athanasius Kirchers ‘China illustrata’ ” in: Roman Malek ed., Western learning and Christianity in China - The Contribution and Impact of Johann Adam Schall von Bell, S. J.（1592-1666）vol. 2, St. Augustin (Monumenta Serica), 1998.
 “Encounter of the European and Chinese Dragon in the 17th and 18th centuries”, in Collection of essays of the symposium on the 40th anniversary of the founding of the History Department of Fu Jen Catholic University, Taipei (History Department of Fu Jen Catholic University), 2003.
 “Chinese illustrations of nature in the 17th and 18th centuries and their influence on European art, landscape gardening and urban landscapes”, in Sinology as a Bridge between Chinese and Western Cultures: A Selection of Special Lectures of the Monumenta Serica Sinological Research Center, Taipei (Fu Jen Catholic University Press), 2010.
 “Ostasiatische Kunst, China und Europa＂, in Enzyklopädie der Neuzeit (1450-1850), Band 9, Stuttgart (J.B. Metzler Verlag), 2011.  
 “The construction of Chinese style gardens in 18th century German by using the garden of Wörlitz (1764-1813) and the Chinese garden of Oranienbaum (1793-1797) as examples”, in Face to Face. The transcendence of the arts in China and beyond – Historical Perspectives, II, 2,  Rui Oliveira Lopes ed., Lisbon (Artistic Studies Research Centre, Faculty of Fine Arts University of Lisbon), 2014.
 Preliminary History of Fu Jen Catholic University, Co-editor, Taipei (Fu Jen Catholic University Press), 2015.

Published articles
 “The poet and Geisha Hsüeh Tao in the 8th and 9th centuries”, in Historical Journal, Taipei, No. 39, 1984. 
 “Chinese porcelain of the Ming period (1368-1644)”, in Historical Journal, Taipei, No. 40, 1985.
 “Dokument 1: Augenzeugenbericht eines Studenten über das Massaker vom 4. Juni 1989”, in China aktuell, Hamburg (Institut für Asienkunde, Berichtsmonat), 1989.
 “Max Beckmann”, in Artist, Taipei, Nr. 187, 1990.
 “Brunelleschi and Renaissance architecture”, in ARTIMA, Taipei, Nr. 44, 1993.
 “Cultural exchange between the East and the West with the example of a portrait of Adam Schall von Bell”, in The National Palace Museum Monthly of Chinese Art, Taipei, Nr. 169, 1997.
  “The emergence of art history as a discipline of science and the art historian Aby Warburg”, in Artist Magazine, Taipei, No. 265, 1997.
 “Kulturaustausch zwischen Europa und Asien in Natur und Landschaftdarstellungen”, in Diskus, Göttingen (Heinrich-Böll-Stiftung), 1997.
  “Administrative buildings of the Taiwan governor's office, 1912-1919: a study of central and local administrative architecture”, in Fu Jen Historical Journal, no.17, Taipei (Department of History of Fu Jen Catholic University), 2006.
  “Exchange between Eastern and Western architecture from the perspective of the central axis alignment with the example of the administrative buildings of Taiwan’s governor’s office”, in Fu Jen Historical Journal, no.19, Taipei (Department and Graduate Institute of History of Fu Jen Catholic University), 2007.
 “Images of China’s Imperial City of the 17th and 18th centuries in Europe”, in Art Journal, no.2, Taipei (Taipei National University of the Arts, Art Faculty), 2008.
 “The Pineapple Images by Michael Boym and the Circulation of Pineapple Images in Europe in the 17th Century” , in The National Palace Museum Research Quarterly , vol. 28, no. 1, Taipei, (The National Palace Museum Press), 2010.
 “A Study of Documents and Review of Research on the History of Exchange in Landscape Gardens in Germany”, in Fu Jen Historical Journal, no.34, Taipei, (Department and Graduate Institute of History of Fu Jen Catholic University), 2015.
 “The Layout of the building complex in the Historicism style in the new Chengchung area of Taipei City during the Japanese colonial period”, in Newsletter of the Association of Art History Research of Taiwan'', issue 3, Taipei (Association of Art History Research of Taiwan), 2017.
 “Transitional Justice in the Spaces of the Humboldt Forum in Berlin and Freedom Square in Taipei”, in: The Sculpture Research Semiyearly,  issue 22, Taipei (Juming Museum), 2019.

References

External links
 Sheng-Ching Chang - Graduate Institute of Museum Studies at Fu Jen Catholic University
 Sheng-Ching Chang - Department of History at Fu Jen Catholic University
 Sheng-Ching Chang - Academia.edu
 Sheng-Ching Chang - Researchgate.net
 Sheng-Ching Chang - NCL Periodical Information Center

Taiwanese art historians
Living people
Humboldt University of Berlin alumni
University of Hamburg alumni
Fu Jen Catholic University alumni
Academic staff of Fu Jen Catholic University
1963 births